The Pear (also Por) are an ethnic group indigenous to northwestern Cambodia. As of 2008, their total population was 1,830 people living in three or four villages in Rovieng District
of Preah Vihear Province.

See also
 Pearic peoples

Notes

Ethnic groups in Cambodia
Indigenous peoples of Southeast Asia